The Commissioner for South Georgia and the South Sandwich Islands is the representative of the British monarch in the United Kingdom's overseas territory of South Georgia and the South Sandwich Islands. The post is held in conjunction with the Governorship of the Falkland Islands.

The post was created in 1985 when South Georgia and the South Sandwich Islands was split from the Falkland Islands Dependencies to create a new overseas territory. As the territory has no native inhabitants, and the only population is the visiting military garrisons, and scientists from the British Antarctic Survey, there was no appointment of a governor. Instead the post of Commissioner was created, the normal practice for uninhabited territory. The post was to be held by the current Governor of the Falkland Islands, as that is the nearest inhabited overseas territory to SGSSI, and the presence of the Royal Navy in the South Atlantic allows the Commissioner to be transported to the territory relatively quickly if necessary.

The Commissioner retains the same powers as a Governor, and is responsible for domestic affairs within the territory. The British Government retains responsibility for defence and international relations. The Commissioner has her own flag for the territory, a Union Flag defaced with the territory's coat of arms. The arms were authorised for the Commissioner on 14 February 1992.

List of commissioners

References